Liaoning cuisine is derived from the native cooking styles of the Liaoning Province in China. It is the most famous Northeastern Chinese cuisine.

Characteristic features
The main characteristics of Liaoning cuisine is that it is colorful, tastes are strong, food is soft, and one dish has many flavors/tastes, however, the sweet taste and the salty taste are very distinct.

Some dishes include pickled Chinese cabbage stir fried with vermicelli, chicken and mushroom stew, lamb kebabs, "malatang" (literally, spicy and hot) soup, stewed chicken with mushrooms, stewed catfish with eggplant, stewed pork with beans, and sliced potatoes with chili.

Since the province shares a border with North Korea, there are dishes similar to Korean cuisine, as well as a large Korean population. The food of Dalian is famed for consuming jellyfish and sea cucumbers by being a coastal city.

Notable dishes

See also
 Northeastern Chinese cuisine
 Chinese cuisine
 Jilin cuisine

References

Regional cuisines of China
Culture in Liaoning